Alessandro Siani (born Alessandro Esposito on  17 September 1975) is an Italian actor, director, screenwriter and stand-up comedian.

Life and career 
Born  in Naples, Siani formed at the Tunnel Cabaret's acting laboratory in his hometown. In 1995, shortly after having won the "Charlot Prize" as best comedian, he decided to adopt the stage name Siani in honour of the journalist and  camorra victim Giancarlo Siani. After being part of the comedy trio "A Testa in giù" and after having appeared in a number of variety shows, he got his first success in 2004 as a  stand-up comedian with the stage show Fiesta.

Siani made his film debut in 2006 in the romantic comedy Ti lascio perché ti amo troppo, and following a few other roles he had his breakout in 2010 with the box office hit Benvenuti al Sud, which also got him a nomination for David di Donatello  for Best Supporting Actor. In 2013 he debuted as director with The Unlikely Prince.

Filmography

Director
 The Unlikely Prince (2013)
 Si accettano miracoli (2015)
 Mr. Happiness (2017)
 The Most Beautiful Day in the World (2019)
 Who Framed Santa Claus? (2021)

Actor
 Ti lascio perché ti amo troppo (2006)
 Natale a New York (2006)
 Natale in crociera (2007)
 La seconda volta non si scorda mai (2008)
 Benvenuti al Sud (2010)
 The Worst Week of My Life (2011)
 Benvenuti al Nord (2012) (actor)
 The Unlikely Prince (2013)
 Si accettano miracoli (2015)
 Mr. Happiness (2017)
 The Most Beautiful Day in the World (2019)
 Who Framed Santa Claus? (2021)

Producer
 Troppo Napoletano   (2016) (producer)

Literary works 

 2010 -  Un napoletano come me...e che t'o dico a fà!, Rizzoli (100k copies sold)
 2013 - Non si direbbe che sei napoletano, Mondadori (Best Seller)
 2013 - L'Italia abusiva. Viaggio comico in un paese diversamente autorizzato (Best Seller)
 2015 - Troppo napoletano, Mondadori
 2019 - Napolitudine. Dialoghi sulla vita, la felicità e la smania 'e turnà, with Luciano De Crescenzo, Milano, Mondadori. . (Ranked for over ten weeks)

References

External links 
 
 

Film people from Naples
1975 births
Living people
21st-century Italian male actors
Italian male film actors
Italian stand-up comedians
Italian television personalities
Italian male stage actors
Male actors from Naples